María Justa de Jesús (January 6, 1667 - 1723) was a Spanish Franciscan nun and mystic who was tried as a witch during the Inquisition.

Early life 
She was born in La Victoria de Acentejo on the north of the island of Tenerife in the Spanish Canary Islands. She trained as a Franciscan in the Saint Joseph Convent in La Orotava. Her life was involved in mysticism and controversy.

Career 
The Holy Inquisition tried her as a witch. She was accused of practicing Molinist doctrines. It was hinted that the relationship with her confessor was not appropriate for a religious person. Her biographer and confessor, Andrés de Abreu, burned the biography he had written about her.

However, Dominican friar Jose Herrera said that among her virtues was to give sight to the blind, to make the deaf hear, the mute to speak, heal the lame, heal diseases and expel demons.

Sr. Maria Justa healed the sick by transferring to her person the evils and diseases that afflicted them. Shamanic priests in other cultures used analogous techniques to cure convalescents. That similarity fed the suspicions of those who called her an  "alumbrada". During these healings, the nun suffered multiple ailments, covering her body in sores and elevating her body temperature, which brought her to the brink of death.

Death 
Sister Maria Justa died in 1723. According to the chronicles of the time, her body showed signs of sanctity, such as flexibility, pleasant fragrances and fluidity of her blood. After her death, the Franciscan Order in the Canary Islands conducted a process of canonization that was later halted.

Alumbrados 
Her case was ascribed to the phenomenon of the "Alumbrados" that arose in small Castilian towns two centuries earlier. These were people who professed doctrines considered heretical by the Catholic Church, believing that union with God came only through mystical experiences and private prayer, without the need for Church sacraments..

See also 
 List of saints of the Canary Islands

References 

1667 births
1723 deaths
17th-century Christian mystics
18th-century Christian mystics
People from Tenerife
Franciscan nuns
Franciscan mystics
Franciscan spirituality
17th-century Spanish nuns
Spanish Inquisition
Stigmatics
Burials in the Province of Santa Cruz de Tenerife
18th-century Spanish nuns
Witch trials in Spain